Mohini is the only female avatar of the Hindu god Vishnu and goddess Parvati.

Mohini may also refer to:

People
Mohini (Tamil actress) (born 1978), an Indian Tamil actress
Mohini (Assamese actress) (1919–1951), an Indian Assamese actress
Mohini Bhardwaj (born 1978), a retired Indian-American gymnast
Mohini Mohun Chatterji (1858–1936), a Bengali attorney and scholar
Mohini Dey (born 1996), Indian bass player
Ratna Mohini (1904–1988), a Javanese dancer and the wife of French photographer Henri Cartier-Bresson
V. Mohini Giri (born 1938), an Indian social activist

Films & TV
Mohini Bhasmasur, a 1913 Indian silent film
Mohini (1948 film), a 1948 Indian Tamil film
Mohini (1957 film), a 1957 Indian Hindi film
 Mohini Bhasmasura, a 1966 Indian Kannada film
Mohini (2018 film), a 2018 Indian Tamil film
Mohini 9886788888, a 2006 Indian Kannada film
Mohini (TV series), an Indian Tamil soap opera

Fictional characters
Mohini, a female character in Tezaab
Mohini, a character in the film Baaghi 2
Mohini, a character from Lemonade Mouth
Mohini, a character from Happy New Year

Indian surnames
Indian feminine given names